Soo Line 353 is a restored 0-6-0 type steam locomotive of the Minneapolis, St. Paul and Sault Ste. Marie Railway (“Soo Line”) B-4 class. It is now owned & operated by WMSTR (Western Minnesota Steam Threshers Reunion) every Labor Day weekend.

History

The locomotive was built by the American Locomotive Company's Brooks Works in 1920 for the Minneapolis, St. Paul and Sault Ste. Marie Railway. It and its other class B-4 locomotives were the last, and largest design of purpose-built switch engines that the Soo Line owned, any heavier switching duties were performed by down-graded 2-8-0 freight engines. By 1954, No. 353 was off the active roster and put on the deadline. In 1955, it and fellow classmate #346 (built by ALCO-Schenectady in 1915) were sold to the Koppers Coke and Gas Company to switch coal hoppers around the coke plant. In March 1964, both the 346 and the 353 were retired from service when the plant bought a second hand Whitcomb 65-ton diesel (formerly owned by the Oliver Iron Mining Company).

In 1965, it was donated to the Minnesota Transportation Museum, where it was stored until 1972 when it was sold to the Western Minnesota Steam Thresher's Reunion, whose volunteers restored it to operation in 1978 for use during their threshing show at Rollag, Minnesota.

See also 

 Soo Line 2645
 Duluth and Northeastern 29
 Milwaukee Road 1004

References 

353
ALCO locomotives
0-6-0 locomotives
Individual locomotives of the United States
Railway locomotives introduced in 1920
Standard gauge locomotives of the United States
Preserved steam locomotives of Minnesota